Anthony Samuel Ippolito (September 19, 1917 – November 12, 1951) was an American football guard who played one season with the Chicago Bears of the National Football League (NFL). He was drafted by the Philadelphia Eagles in the seventh round of the 1939 NFL Draft. He played college football at Purdue University and attended St. Ignatius College Prep in Chicago, Illinois. He served in World War II for the United States Army.

References

External links
Just Sports Stats

1917 births
1951 deaths
Players of American football from Chicago
American football guards
Purdue Boilermakers football players
Chicago Bears players
United States Army personnel of World War II
St. Ignatius College Prep alumni